Ricardo Cantú Garza (born 23 May 1953) is a Mexican politician affiliated with the Labor Party. He served as a federal deputy in the LVII, LX and LXII Legislatures of the Mexican Congress representing the State of Mexico. Previously, he served as a local deputy in the LXVII Legislature of the Congress of Nuevo León.

References

1953 births
Living people
Politicians from Nuevo León
Labor Party (Mexico) politicians
20th-century Mexican politicians
21st-century Mexican politicians
Deputies of the LXII Legislature of Mexico
Members of the Chamber of Deputies (Mexico) for the State of Mexico
Members of the Congress of Nuevo León
Autonomous University of Nuevo León alumni